Ragıp Reha Özcan (born 5 July 1965) is a Turkish actor. He is best known for his role Fikri Elibol in the TV series Bizim Hikaye.

Life and career
Ragıp Reha Özcan was born on 5 July 1965 in Bingöl, Turkey. He has a brother Serhat Özcan, also an actor. He graduated from Mimar Sinan Fine Arts University in 1987. He started working in the Trabzon State Theater in the same year. He was appointed to the Istanbul State Theater in the 1990–1991.

He settled in Antalya during the 1992–1993 theatre season and took part in the Antalya State Theater. He also worked as a director in the Akdeniz University Theater Club and Antalya Metropolitan Municipality Theater, and was appointed to the Istanbul State Theater in the 2010–2011 season.

He has appeared in a lot of series, movies and theater plays. He had his first role in a theater play in 1985. He played hit series Suskunlar which the first Turkish drama sold to the USA market for remake.His most famous series were Maral, where he depicted the character of Halis in 2014–2015. In 2017, he depicted the character of Fikri Elibol in the series Bizim Hikaye, which was broadcast on FOX. His ongoing project is Mucize Doktor, in which he portrays the character of Doctor Adil.

Filmography

Television
Üç Kız Kardeş  2022 - Sadık Kalender
 Mucize Doktor 2019–2021 - Prof. Dr. Adil Erdinç
 Bizim Hikaye: Serdar Gözelekli, Koray Kerimoğlu - 2017–2019 - Fikri Elibol
 Yaşamak Güzel Şey : Müfit Can Saçıntı - 2017
 Adı Efsane: Devrim Yalçın - 2017 - Hasan
 Sen Benim Herşeyimsin: Tolga Örnek - 2016
 Gecenin Kraliçesi: Durul Taylan & Yağmur Taylan - 2016 - Baba Osman
 Maral: En Güzel Hikayem: Bahadır İnce - 2015 - Halis Feyman
 Öyle ya da Böyle: Alper Kaya - 2015
 Karadayı: Uluç Bayraktar - 2014 - Vehbi Duru
 Unutursam Fısılda: Çağan Irmak - 2014
 Buna Değer: Can Oral - 2014
 Muhteşem Yüzyıl: Yağız Alp Akaydın, Mert Baykal - 2014
 Fatih: Merve Girgin, Faruk Teber - 2013 
 Ölü ya da Diri: Jorgo Papavassiliou - 2013
 Suskunlar: Umur Turagay - 2012 - Sait Karam
 Tepenin Ardı: Emin Alper - 2012 
 Kurtlar Vadisi Pusu: Onur Tan - 2011 - Jozef Beile
 Yangın Var: Murat Saraçoğlu - 2011 - Emniyet Müdürü
 Üsküdar'a Giderken: Selçuk Aydemir - 2011 - Berber Bürge
 IV. Osman: Semra Dündar - 2009 - Commissioner Osman Toprak 
 Bahtı Kara: Theron Patterson - 2008 - Adnan
 Dağlar Delisi: Taner Akvardar - 2007 - Porsuk

Film
 Uzun Zaman Önce (Salih, 2019)
 Aydede (Necati, 2018)
 8 (Sekiz) (2018)
 Poyraz Karayel: Küresel Sermaye (Amir Yıldız, 2017)
 Yaşamak Güzel Şey (2017)
 İstanbul Kırmızısı (2016)
 Sen Benim Herşeyimsin (2016)
 Öyle ya da Böyle (Sadık, 2015)
 Çare-Sizlik (Hakim, 2014)
 Unutursam Fısılda (2014)
 Buna Değer (2014)
 Ölü ya da Diri (2013)
 Kor (Short film, 2013)
 Tepenin Ardı (Nusret, 2012)
 Yangın Var (2011)
 Buhar (Short film, 2011)
 Bahtı Kara (Adnan, 2008)

References

External links

1965 births
Living people
Turkish male television actors
Turkish male film actors
21st-century Turkish male actors
Mimar Sinan Fine Arts University alumni
People from Bingöl